Liberties, Independents, Overseas and Territories (LIOT), formerly Liberties & Territories (LT) is a parliamentary group in the French National Assembly. It was formed on 17 October 2018, with deputies from centre-left and centre-right parties, as well as Corsican nationalist parties.

History 

The group was formed on 17 October 2018, led by co-leaders Bertrand Pancher and Philippe Vigier. Prior negotiations between Corsican nationalist deputies, Olivier Falorni, and François Pupponi had failed at the beginning of the legislature. At its founding, the group defined itself as in the "minority," refusing to register as either being in the majority or in opposition to the government. This led to a disagreement over their placement in the National Assembly. The group's deputies demanded to be placed together in the center of the hemicycle protesting by boycotting the photograph of the Assembly bringing together all the deputies. The group ultimately joined the opposition on July 30, 2020.

Membership

Current Members

Former Members

Historical Membership

List of Presidents

Notes

References

External links 
 Groupe Libertés et Territoires deputies 

National Assembly (France)
Parliamentary groups in France
2018 establishments in France
Political parties established in 2018
Social liberal parties